Joppolo is a comune (municipality) in the Province of Vibo Valentia in the Italian region of Calabria, located about  southwest of Catanzaro and about  southwest of Vibo Valentia.

Notable people
Januarius (died 305), patron saint of Naples, is thought to have been born here.

References

Cities and towns in Calabria